The American Journal of Trial Advocacy is a law review edited and published by students at Cumberland School of Law. It was established in 1977 by Dean Donald E. Corely  The current editor-in-chief is Jackson Parker.

Editors-in-Chief 
Prior Editors-in-Chief include (incomplete list):

References

External links 
 

American law journals
Triannual journals
Publications established in 1977
English-language journals
Law journals edited by students